Area code 775 is a Nevada telephone area code in the North American Numbering Plan. It was split from area code 702 on December 12, 1998, and covers the entire state except for Clark County, which retained area code 702 after the split. Major cities in this area code include Reno, Carson City, Elko and Pahrump. While it appears to be rural, more than 80 percent of its numbers are located in the far western portion, around Reno and Carson City.

Prior to the creation of 775, area code 702 had served all of Nevada for 51 years.  The state's dramatic growth in the second half of the 20th century, and the corresponding growth in telephone service, would have made a second area code a must in any event. However, the proliferation of cell phones, pagers, and fax machines, particularly in Las Vegas, Reno and Carson City, hastened the need for the expansion of Nevada's number pool.

Despite Reno and Carson City's continued growth, 775 is nowhere near exhaustion. Under the most recent projections, northern Nevada will not need another area code until late 2045.

Prior to October 2021, area code 775 had telephone numbers assigned for the central office code 988. In 2020, 988 was designated nationwide as a dialing code for the National Suicide Prevention Lifeline, which created a conflict for exchanges that permit seven-digit dialing. This area code was therefore scheduled to transition to ten-digit dialing by October 24, 2021.

See also
 List of NANP area codes

References

External links

775
775

ko:775